In recent years, housing development has ballooned in China as its economy has developed. Since 1978, the government has promoted the commercialization of housing in urban areas. Property development has become big business in China, with new cities and suburbs springing up with new apartments.

Housing construction 
It is an important objective of the Chinese government to promote economic development and launching building developments is an important way of doing this. However, property development in China is vastly outgrowing the number of people who can purchase new homes, concerning many sociologists who argue that it is leading to a deepening of social divisions in the country.

However it is expected between 2009 and 2030, China will add further 850 million people to its middle class. According to a study by McKinsey, 54 percent of China's urban households were considered "mass middle" class in 2012 but will increase to 76 percent of China's urban population by 2022.  Due to a growing number of higher-paying high-tech and service industry jobs, 54 percent will also be classified as "upper middle" class. The new future surge in additional upper middle class earns more than the "mass middle class" , and hence is able to afford higher rent, more consumption and indicates a possibility that this new rise in unprecedented forecasted number of "upper middle class" may be able to better match the large number of property developments in the future.

Many apartments, hotels and shops remain empty for years being called ghost cities or ghost malls, with many Chinese unable to afford them. As The Economist says, "If there is one thing that annoys the man on the Beijing omnibus, it is the cost of housing in China's cities."

However ghost cities in China have had an under-reported degree of success in filling up. According to Wade Shepherd, after the ghost cities becomes a thriving city, they no longer become a much talked about topic in the western media.  Ex ghost cities are rarely news compared to when they were ghost cities.  Wade says, "It generally takes at least a decade for China’s new urban developments to start breaking the inertia of stagnation. But once they do, they tend to keep growing, eventually blending in with the broader urban landscape and losing their “ghost city” label."

This issue of cost of housing in China, was not applicable to the housing market pre-1978 in China. Before the 1970s, the construction of housing in China was sacrificed for the development of industries and industrial growth. The construction of the housing industry only received a small portion of state-allocated funds to continue to develop the industry. Low rents for urban housing were enticing to many people, causing the available housing to be rented out quickly, giving the state little money for the precious space they are renting out. This led to a shortage of housing and a shortage of funds to build more housing.

Between the years of 1995 and 2015, the total investment allocated to the housing industry from the Chinese government has increased from a cap of 50,000 yuan to a cut-off point of 5 million yuan, showing a renewed interest in housing development in recent years from the Chinese government after years of limited funding towards the urban housing projects. The Chinese government announced in March 2011 the objective of building 36 million units of housing by 2015. In September 2011 alone, work commenced on 1.2 million units across China; a 70% increase in the construction of social housing compared with 2010 construction. By 2014, Chinese builders have added 100 billion square feet of housing space in China, equating to 74 square feet per person. Construction of urban housing was a major undertaking. The country has shown a major shift in allocating funds and resources to housing their people, building over 5.5 million apartments between the years of 2003 and 2014 in China’s cities. These construction projects assigned by the state influence the construction job market in China as well. In 2014 alone, 29 million people were employed in urban construction businesses around China.

Property bubble 

The 2011 estimates by property analysts state that there are some 89 million empty properties and apartments in China, and that housing development in China is massively oversupplied and overvalued, and is a bubble waiting to burst with serious consequences in the future.  The BBC cites Ordos in Inner Mongolia as the largest ghost town in China, full of empty shopping malls and apartment complexes. However there have later been contradictions to this property bubble theory as for example, CNN in 2015 also cites The New South China Mall in Dongguan, the biggest shopping mall in the world, was virtually empty for over a decade and that its owners were determined to make the mall full occupancy again. In 2018 after renovations, the mall is reported almost at full occupancy and no longer a "ghost mall". Indicating that the theoretical reasons of a property bubble making it a ghost mall in 2015, may not have even been the determining factor given the only changes were renovations to bring in mass tenants 

Though a large, and largely uninhabited urban real estate development has been constructed 25 km from Dongsheng District in the Kangbashi New Area. Intended to house a million people, it remains largely uninhabited. Intended to have 300,000 residents by 2010, government figures stated it had 28,000 residents by this time. However, in 2017, the ghost city label is less valid to hang on Ordos Kangbashi. According to a report in 2017, the population has increased to 153,000 people living there, 4,750 businesses are now in operation, and housing prices have risen roughly 50% on average from the end of 2015. Of the 40,000 apartments that had been built in the new district since 2004, only 500 are still on the market.

Critics argue that the national social-housing programme disproportionally benefits the urban population and that not only can many of the rural poor ill afford new housing in the cities, but they also find it difficult to obtain household-registration certificates (hukou). The housing development schemes is also affecting the concentration of unemployment as once housing development are completed, workers may be laid off. According to the former Director of China's Housing & Real Estate Administration Bureau, Professor Lin, as of 2008, Beijing had an average of 1.41 individuals per room across the city.

China's housing prices are closely related to the high capital returns and resource reallocation. China's housing prices have been growing nearly twice as fast as national income over the past decade, despite a high vacancy rate and a high rate of return to capital. The bubble arises because high capital returns driven by resource reallocation are not sustainable in the long run. Rational expectations of a strong future demand for alternative stores of value can thus induce currently productive agents to speculate in the housing market.

See also 
 Forced evictions in China
 List of under-occupied developments in China
 Real estate in China
 People's commune, collectivist living

References

External links
 Video about the property bubble in China

 
Economy of China
Society of China